NSEB may refer to:
NS Electronics Bangkok
National Security Education Board
National Standard Examination in Biology